Cheick Oumar Doucouré (born 8 January 2000) is a Malian professional footballer who plays as a defensive midfielder for Premier League club Crystal Palace and the Mali national team.

Club career
Doucouré developed as a youth player at JMG Academy Bamako. He then spent his 2016/17 season with AS Real Bamako before moving the following season to RC Lens. Doucouré quickly cemented his place at Lens in the 2018/19 Ligue 2 campaign with him playing a total of 34 games across all competitions that season.

On 11 July 2022, Doucouré signed a five-year contract with Crystal Palace.

International career
In October 2018 he received his first call-up to the Mali national football team. He made his debut for Mali in a 1–0 2019 Africa Cup of Nations qualification win over Gabon on 17 November 2018.

Career statistics

International

References

External links

Profile at the Crystal Palace F.C. website

2000 births
Living people
Sportspeople from Bamako
Association football midfielders
Malian footballers
RC Lens players
Crystal Palace F.C. players
Ligue 1 players
Ligue 2 players
Championnat National 2 players
Premier League players
Mali international footballers
Mali youth international footballers
2019 Africa Cup of Nations players
Malian expatriate footballers
Expatriate footballers in England
Expatriate footballers in France
Malian expatriate sportspeople in England
Malian expatriate sportspeople in France
21st-century Malian people